"Don't Talk" is a song written, produced and performed by American contemporary R&B singer Jon B, issued as the only official single from his third studio album Pleasures U Like. The song peaked at #58 on the Billboard Hot 100 in 2001.

Music video

The official music video for the song was directed by Marcus Raboy.

Charts

Weekly charts

Year-end charts

References

External links
 
 

2001 songs
2001 singles
Jon B. songs
Epic Records singles
Music videos directed by Marcus Raboy
Song recordings produced by Jon B.
Songs written by Jon B.